The 1984 Boston University Terriers football team was an American football team that represented Boston University as a member of the Yankee Conference during the 1984 NCAA Division I-AA football season. In their eighth season under head coach Rick Taylor, the Terriers compiled a 9–3 record (4–1 against conference opponents), tied for the Yankee Conference championship, lost to Richmond in the first round of the NCAA Division I-AA Football Championship playoffs, and outscored opponents by a total of 287 to 187.

Schedule

References

Boston University
Boston University Terriers football seasons
Yankee Conference football champion seasons
Boston University Terriers football